Arconovaldo Bonaccorsi (1898 – 2 July 1962) was an Italian Fascist soldier, politician and lawyer. Nicknamed "Conte Rossi", he played a prominent role in organising the Falangist conquest of the island of Majorca during the Spanish Civil War.

Biography

Born in Bologna in 1898, Bonacorsi was a fanatical and idealistic fascist from the first moment he met Benito Mussolini after World War I. In 1922 he participated in the March on Rome as leader of the fascists from Bologna. He graduated from the prestigious Universita di Bologna as an attorney in 1928, and soon began defending Italian fascists. In the early 1930s he married and had three children.

His moment of glory came when Mussolini sent him to the Balearic Islands at the beginning of the Spanish Civil War. Arriving in Majorca in August 1936, he became known as 'Conde Rossi' ("The Red Count"), a name derived from his red beard. He was soon able to galvanize Nationalist forces on the island, leading them in a decisive victory over the Republicans at Manacor.

Gilberto Oneto, an Italian journalist, wrote the following about Bonaccorsi and the Italians in Majorca:

In Oneto's opinion, when Bonaccorsi first arrived on the island, the Italians only supported the possibility of promoting a semi-independent Majorca (under Italian influence) in the event of Republican victory in the Spanish Civil War. But with Franco's victory, they understood that this project of "partial" independence was impossible.

Antifascist writers raised much criticism against Bonaccorsi. George Bernanos wrote about the Bonaccorsi-created Dragones de la Muerte, a well-armed force of young Majorcan fighters who performed well at the battle of Porto Cristo (Manacor), but later were responsible for many murders. According to Bernanos's eyewitness report, Bonaccorsi was "well to the fore in all religious manifestations" and "was usually supported by a chaplain picked up on the spot, in army-breeches and top-boots, a white cross on his chest and pistols stuck in his belt".
 
The clergy of Majorca, on the other hand, were very grateful to Bonaccorsi, and the Archbishop of the Balearic Islands, José Miralles y Sbert, often praised him. Francisco Franco awarded him the Spanish Grand Cross of Military Merit with Red Decoration. The Correo de Majorca, the local newspaper, wrote gratefully in February 1937 as a last salute that "we will forever remember your heroism and will give to our descendants the memory of what you did for us" Furthermore, Bonaccorsi was celebrated in ceremonies by many civilians of Majorca

On 14 December 1936 – shortly after Bonaccorsi captured Ibiza with a force of 500 phalangists – the British Foreign Secretary Anthony Eden wrote a memorandum to his government in which he highlighted the possibility of Italy creating a "Protectorate" in Majorca. Immense pressure was put on Mussolini to remove Bonaccorsi from the Balearics; consequently, in February 1937, he was promoted to "General of the Blackshirts" (Console delle Milizie fasciste) and sent to the Málaga front with the Italian Corpo Truppe Volontari. He never returned to Majorca. Later, he was sent to Italian Ethiopia, where he complained to Mussolini about the Italian Empire's dire lack of preparedness in case of war.

In 1940 Bonaccorsi participated in the conquest of British Somaliland as military commander of the "Reparto Speciale Autonomo della Milizia fascista", a 300-man Italian commando Unit.

Finally, he was a prisoner of war from 1941 to 1946; after the war he resumed his legal and political activities, and defended German General Otto Wagener, who was sentenced to 15 years in prison for atrocities he had committed in Rhodes during World War II. in 1949 Bonaccorsi created the "Associazione Nazionale Combattenti Italiani di Spagna (ANCIS)" and in the same year applied for membership in the neofascist political party "MSI".

Bonaccorsi was a candidate for the Italian Social Movement (MSI) in 1958. He died in 1962 in Rome. The Italian newspaper Il Secolo d'Italia praised him in a funeral article, which noted that he was one of the few military commanders who had received medals for combat valor from three countries (Italy, Spain and Germany).

Medals and decorations

Bonaccorsi received four medals of honour for combat in 1936 Spain:

 Silver Medal of Military Valor (Medaglia d'argento al valor militare)

 Military Order of Savoy (Cavaliere dell´Ordine militare di Savoia)

 German Iron Cross (Croce di Ferro di I classe)

 Spanish Grand Cross of Military Merit with Red Decoration (Gran Croce militare spagnola)

Francisco Franco in 1937 gave him the Grand Cross of Military Merit with Red Decoration.

He was welcomed and praised again in 1957 by Franco, receiving the Spanish nickname Cruzado en camisa negra (blackshirt crusader).

See also
 Italian occupation of Majorca
 Battle of Majorca

References

Bibliography
Massot, Josep. Vida i miracles del Conde Rossi Editorial Serrador. Barcelona, 1988 

1898 births
1962 deaths
Italian fascists
Italian people of the Spanish Civil War
Italian military personnel of World War II
Italian prisoners of war
World War II prisoners of war held by the United Kingdom
Military personnel from Bologna
Jurists from Bologna
Politicians from Bologna